Manirang is one of the highest mountains in the Indian state Himachal Pradesh. It lies on the border between Kinnaur district and Lahaul and Spiti district. Close to the peak is the high Manirang pass, which was one of the early trade routes between Spiti and Kinnaur, before the motorable road was built.  The trail over the pass starts from Mane Yogma on the Spiti side and runs to the Ropa valley in Kinnaur.

See also
 List of Ultras of the Himalayas

References 

Mountains of Himachal Pradesh
Geography of Kinnaur district
Geography of Lahaul and Spiti district
Six-thousanders of the Himalayas